Sprout or Sprouts may refer to:

Botany
 Brussels sprout, an edible vegetable of the brasicca genus
 Shoot, the early growth of a plant
 Sprouting, the practice of germinating seeds, often for food purposes
 Alfalfa sprouts
 bean sprouts:
 Soybean sprout
 Mung bean sprout
 Broccoli sprouts

Places
 Sprout, Kentucky
 Sprout Creek, in Dutchess County, New York
 Sprouts of the Mohawk River, a section of the Mohawk River

People
 Sprout (surname)
 Sprout, a pseudonym of the Irish author Michael Carroll (born 1966)
 Sprouts Elder (1904–1957), international motorcycle speedway rider

Arts, entertainment, and media
 Sprout (2012 TV series), a series of Japanese drama aired on Nippon Television
 Sprout (block), a program block on Universal Kids, previously an American television network
 Sprout (novel), a 2009 young adult novel by Dale Peck
 Sprouts (game), a pencil-and-paper game
 Little Green Sprout, the sidekick to the Jolly Green Giant advertising mascot
 Sprout, a former name of Universal Kids, an American pay television channel

Brands and enterprises
 Sprout (computer), a Hewlett-Packard computer introduced in 2014
 Sprout World,  a maker of pencils
 Sprouts Farmers Market, an Arizona-based chain of specialty grocery stores

Other uses
 Sprouts of capitalism, features of the economy of the late Ming and early Qing dynasties